The complete discography of The Kabeedies.

Releases

The Radical Tearoom; CD (3 September 2008)
  Petits Filous 
  Lovers Ought To 
  Mythical Beasts 
  Coaster Games  
  Paddling 
  Adhesive Stick 
  Sideburns 
  Come On 
  Coaster Game (Halfby and Walkman - Hotel Baltimore Remix)

Ten Animals I Slam In A Net; 7" EP (1 September 2008)
 Palindromes
 King Canute
 Coaster Game (Acoustic)

Lovers Ought To; 7" Single (20 May 2008)
 Lovers Ought To  
 Mythical Beasts   
 Come On

Treasure Hunting; 7" Single (20 October 2008)
 Treasure Hunting
 Treasure Hunting (Bobby McGees Cover)
 Treasure Hunting (Francis & Louis Cover)

Little Brains; 7" + CD Single (13 April 2009)
 Little Brains
 Fuzzy Felt
 Duck Egg Blue

Petits Filous; Single (5 October 2009)
 Petits Filous
 Cut The Cord
 Surfin Kraken

Rumpus; CD Album (9 November 2009)
 Fuzzy Felt
 Lovers Ought To
 Comic Splender
 Petits Filous
 We Make Our Own Adventures
 Duck Egg Blue
 Apple
 Little Brains
 Sideburns
 Petroleum Jelly
 Palindromes
 King Canute
 Treasure Hunting
 Jitterbug

Jitterbug Re-Edit; Download-only Single (15 March 2010)
 Jitterbug Re-Edit

Rumpus Export Edition; CD Album (1 September 2010)
 Fuzzy Felt
 Lovers Ought To
 Comic Splendor
 Petits Filous
 We Make Our Own Adventures
 Duck Egg Blue
 Apple
  Little Brains
  Sideburns
  Petroleum Jelly
  Palindromes
  King Canute
  Treasure Hunting
  Jitterbug
  Cut the Cord
 Surfin Kraken
 Jitterbug Re-Edit
 Coaster Game (Acoustic)
 Lovers Ought To (Acoustic)
  We Make Our Own Adventures (Acoustic)
  King Canute (Acoustic)

Come Out Of The Blue; 7" Vinyl/Download Single (4 October 2010)
 Come Out Of The Blue
 Milk

Santiago; Free Download-only Single (4 April 2011)
 Santiago

References

Discographies of British artists
Rock music group discographies